Brian McKnight is the debut studio album of R&B singer Brian McKnight, released in 1992 by Mercury Records. It features his then-highest charting single, "One Last Cry", which reached number 13 on the US Billboard Hot 100 and sold 500,000 copies. The album itself was certified platinum by the Recording Industry Association of America.

Critical response 

Brian McKnight received positive reviews from most music critics. Entertainment Weekly writer Havelock Nelson, gave the album an A-rating citing that "McKnight is the most comforting R&B singer-songwriter to emerge since Keith Washington early last year."

Track listing

Personnel 
All instruments performed by Brian McKnight except where noted. 

 David Anderson – bass guitar (track 12) 
 Brandon Barnes – drums and keyboard programming (tracks 2 and 9)
 James Blair – drums (track 12)
 Gerry Brown – backing vocals (track 1)
 Cedric Dent – piano (track 10)
 Clare Fischer – strings (tracks 6 and 10)
 The Four Horns – horn arrangements (track 1) 
 Louis Johnson – bass guitar (tracks 2 and 4)
 Kipper Jones – backing vocals (track 11)
 Ricky Lawson – drums (tracks 5, 8 and 9)
 Fred McFarlane – keyboards (track 11)
 Claude McKnight – backing vocals (tracks 10 and 13) 

 Fred McKnight – lead guitar (track 8) 
 Julie McKnight – backing vocals (track 4)
 B.J. Nelson – backing vocals (track 11)
 Kelly O'Neal – saxophone (track 12)
 Phase 5 – drum programming (tracks 1, 3 and 11), keyboard programming (track 1) 
 John R. Robinson – drums (track 10)
 Neil Stubenhaus – bass guitar (track 10)
 Take 6 (Claude V. McKnight, Mark Kibble, David Thomas) – backing vocals (track 10)
 Darryl Tibbs – percussion (track 12)
 Wah Wah Watson – electric guitar (tracks 1 and 2)
 Vanessa Williams – backing vocals (track 1)
 John Willis – lead guitar (track 9), acoustic guitar (track 6)

Charts

Weekly charts

Year-end charts

Certifications

References 

1992 debut albums
Albums produced by Brian McKnight
Brian McKnight albums
Mercury Records albums